Sveti Đurađ or St. George Monastery is a medieval Serbian Orthodox monastery located in Mânăstire, Timiș County, Romania, 20 km from the Romanian-Serbian border. It was established in 1485 by Serbian despot Jovan Branković; the present buildings date to 1794, built by Iguman Augustin Petrović as a school and monastic church.

Services are held here daily in Serbian and Old Church Slavonic. The last resident of the monastery, Sister Evgenija, died in 2020. Among the relics that the monastic church houses is a fragment of the skull of Saint George, brought here in the 15th century by Đorđe Branković, and a piece of the chain with which Saint Peter was bound.

The monastery is listed as a historic monument by Romania's Ministry of Culture. The monastic church and the monks' cells are given as separate entries.

History 
Legend has it that the monastery was founded during the Iconoclastic movement, under Empress Irene and her son Constantine, at the end of the 8th century, but it is much more likely that it was founded much later, in the medieval era.

In the second half of the 15th century, the Serbian despot Đorđe Branković asked the sovereign pontiff for permission to build 12 monasteries on the territory of the Hungarian kingdom. This monastery was built by Jovan Branković, his son. 

After 1944, the monastery became a barracks for a while, then an office building for the agricultural production cooperative in the village. In the 1980s, the workers of Comtim, a local pork producer, were housed here. It was also used as a feed store. It became monastery again only after 1990.

Architecture 
The first church was erected in 1485. It was built of burnt brick in the Serbo-Byzantine style with a cruciform base, a dome and a separate bell tower. It lasted until 1794 when the current church was built, which preserved the foundations of the Serbo-Byzantine style to which Baroque elements were added. The iconostasis is sumptuous, gilded, the interior decoration being representative of the Serbian Baroque. It was painted by Jovan Isailović, and the painting on the walls was executed by a certain Pavle Đurđev, a resident of the monastic estates.

Gallery

See also 
 Hodoș-Bodrog Monastery

References 

Serbian Orthodox monasteries in Romania
Historic monuments in Timiș County
Churches completed in 1794
1485 establishments in Europe